A disintegrin and metalloproteinase with thrombospondin motifs 4 is an enzyme that in humans is encoded by the ADAMTS4 gene.

This gene encodes a member of the ADAMTS (a disintegrin and metalloproteinase with thrombospondin motifs) protein family. Members of the family share several distinct protein modules, including a propeptide region, a metalloproteinase domain, a disintegrin-like domain, and a thrombospondin type 1 (TS) motif. Individual members of this family differ in the number of C-terminal TS motifs, and some have unique C-terminal domains. The enzyme encoded by this gene lacks a C-terminal TS motif. It can degrade aggrecan, a major proteoglycan of cartilage, brevican, a brain-specific extracellular matrix protein, neurocan and versican. The cleavage of aggrecan and brevican suggests key roles of this enzyme in arthritic disease and in the central nervous system, potentially, in the progression of glioma.

Structure 

ADAMTS4 is the shortest known ADAMTS, lacking the C-terminal domain and is the only non-glycosylated ADAMTS. It also only has one thrombospondin type 1 motif (TSR), whereas all the other ADAMTS have two or more TSRs. The TSR is important for binding of the enzyme to the extracellular matrix and hence its substrate specificity. Adjacent to the C-terminal TSR is a disintegrin-like domain, a cysteine-rich region
that stacks against the active-site of the enzyme when in its final folded tertiary structure.

Function 

ADAMTS4 is capable of cleaving all the large chondroitin sulfate hyaluronan-binding proteoglycans (CSPGs), including aggrecan, brevican, neurocan and versican. Like ADAMTS5, it can be effectively inhibited by tissue inhibitor of metalloproteinase-3 (TIMP3) and this inhibition can be enhanced in the presence of aggrecan. In addition to TIMP3, it can also be inhibited by calcium pentosan polysulfate.

ADAMTS4 is expressed in ovary, spinal cord, adrenal cortex, ciliary ganglion, trigeminal ganglion, brain, retina, pancreas (islets), fetal lung, breast myoepithelial cells, tendon and cartilage.

Clinical Significance 

ADAMTS4 (and ADAMTS5) are the major proteinases responsible for the degradation of proteoglycans in articular cartilage in osteoarthritis. Which of these aggrecanases is more important in cartilage degradation appears to be species-specific, with ADAMTS4 more important in human disease (but ADAMTS5 more important in mouse models of osteoarthritis).

Alternative names 
Aggrecanase-1 (initial name reflecting its ability to cleave aggrecan)

References

Further reading

External links 
 The MEROPS online database for peptidases and their inhibitors: M12.221
 

ADAMTS